James William Armstrong (6 September 1901 – 1977) was a professional footballer who played for Spen Black and White, Swalwell-on-Tyne, Chelsea, Tottenham Hotspur, Luton Town and Bristol Rovers.

Football career 
Armstrong joined Chelsea from Spen Black and White in 1922. The forward played 29 matches and scored on nine occasions for the Stamford Bridge club. He joined Tottenham Hotspur in 1927 where he featured in a further 33 games and finding the net five times in all competitions. In 1930 he moved to Luton Town to compete in 10 matches. He finished his career at Bristol Rovers and played in nine matches and netting twice.

References 

1901 births
1977 deaths
Association football forwards
English footballers
Spen Black and White F.C. players
Chelsea F.C. players
Tottenham Hotspur F.C. players
Luton Town F.C. players
Bristol Rovers F.C. players
English Football League players
Date of death missing
Place of death missing